The fuscous flycatcher (Cnemotriccus fuscatus) is a small passerine bird in the tyrant flycatcher family, and the only member of the genus Cnemotriccus. It breeds from Colombia and Venezuela south to Bolivia, Paraguay and Argentina, and on both Trinidad and Tobago. The fuscous flycatcher ranges in northern and eastern South America, including the entire Amazon Basin, and the Guianas; also all of Brazil except the very southeastern border area with Uruguay.

This species is found in woodland and scrubby areas. The nest is made of twigs and bark lined with plant fibre and placed in a tree fork. The typical clutch is three white eggs, which are marked with black at the larger end.

The upperparts are plain brown with darker brown wings and two buff wing bars. There is an obvious long whitish supercilium, and the bill is black. The breast is grey-brown and the abdomen is pale yellow. Sexes are similar. There are other races, differing in the tone of the upperpart or underpart colour.

Fuscous flycatchers are inconspicuous birds, tending to keep to undergrowth perches from which they sally forth to catch insects, (hawking).

References

fuscous flycatcher
Birds of Colombia
Birds of Venezuela
Birds of the Amazon Basin
Birds of the Guianas
Birds of Brazil
Birds of Paraguay
Birds of Trinidad and Tobago
fuscous flycatcher